Coimbatore (North) taluk is a taluk of Coimbatore City of the Indian state of Tamil Nadu. On 9 May 2012, Government of Tamil Nadu announced that it will bifurcate Coimbatore North Taluk to create the new Annur Taluk.

Demographics
According to the 2011 census, the taluk of Coimbatore (North) had a population of 641,021 with 321,922 males and 319,099 females. There were 991 women for every 1,000 men. The taluk had a literacy rate of 76.37%. Child population in the age group below 6 years were 28,302 Males and 27,219 Females.

References 

Taluks of Coimbatore district